The Commonwealth Games sports comprise all the sports officially recognised and approved by the Commonwealth Games Federation (CGF). There are a total of 16 core sports and a further 4 core para-sports that are competed at every games. In addition, the CGF allow organising committees to choose from various optional sports and disciplines to complete their games' program.

At the 1930 British Empire Games, the precursor to the modern Games, there were six sports: athletics, aquatics (swimming and diving), boxing, lawn bowls, rowing, and wrestling.

Sports, disciplines, events
If a number of activities are controlled by the same international federation then the Commonwealth Games Federation recognises each activity as a discipline, which belongs to the respective sport. For example, shooting, which is organised by the International Shooting Sport Federation, is a sport at the Commonwealth Games that comprises four disciplines: clay target, full bore, pistol, and small bore. Furthermore, events for elite athletes with a disability (EAD) comprise a separate discipline within a sport from events for able-bodied athletes. This is the case both for sports where events for EAD and able-bodied athletes are organised by the different federations, as with athletics and World Athletics and the International Paralympic Committee, and for sports where there is a single federation, as with lawn bowls and the World Bowls.

Sports and disciplines feature separate events for which athletes can receive medals. For example, boxing has a number of weight divisions, gymnastics and diving have a number of styles, while athletics has numerous events based upon a wide range of activities.

Types
The Commonwealth Games sports are divided into three main types: core sports, optional sports, and recognised sports. Sixteen core sports and four core para-sports must be included in the Games program, while the host nation may choose to include a number of optional sports and disciplines. Recognised sports are sports which have been approved by the CGF but are deemed to need further growth before their inclusion. The host nation may also apply for the inclusion of a maximum of four team sports to the CGF General Assembly, as the Melbourne organising committee did with basketball for the 2006 Games.

The CGF recognises Commonwealth Games records for a number of sports. In 2002, the CGF introduced the David Dixon Award for the outstanding athlete of the Games.

Core, Optional and Discontinued Commonwealth Games program
The following sports (or disciplines of a sport) make up the core, optional and discontinued Commonwealth Games official program and are listed alphabetically according to the name used by the CGF. The figures in each cell indicate the number of events for each sport contested at the respective Games; a bullet denotes that the sport was contested as a demonstration sport. The Commonwealth Games Charter requires games to include 20 core sports, disciplines and para-sports.

Para-sports were first included in the official program as demonstration sports in 1994 before being fully integrated into the main program in 2002. Between 1962 and 1974, Commonwealth Paraplegic Games were organised directly preceding the able body games; a "p" below denotes that a para-sport was part of the Paraplegic Games program for that year.

Eleven sports consist or have consisted of multiple disciplines. Disciplines from the same sport are grouped under the same color:

 Aquatics –
 Archery –
 Athletics –
 Basketball –
 Cycling –
 Gymnastics –
 Lawn bowls – 
 Shooting –
 Table tennis –
 Triathlon –
 Wrestling

Demonstrations sports

Commonwealth Games programs have also contained a number of demonstration sports, also variously called exhibition sports. The following sports or disciplines have been demonstrated at the Commonwealth Games for the years shown, but have never been included in the main program.

  Polo (1958)
  Show jumping (1958)
  Lacrosse (1978)
  Australian rules football (1982)
  Sepak takraw (1998)
  Silambam (1998)
  Silat (1998)
  Wushu (1998)

In 2014 and 2018, rugby league nines competitions were held preceding the games. These were endorsed by the CGF but were not listed as official demonstration sports.

Changes from 2026
In October 2021, the CGF announced a new games roadmap that will, starting with the 2026 Games, change the requirements for sports competed at the games. The roadmap suggests that approximately 15 sports should be competed at each games. There will be a new category of "Compulsory Sports", containing just athletics and swimming as well as their para-sport disciplines, and these will be the only sports that hosts are required to include in their program. The category of "Core Sports" will be expanded to include all other current core and optional sports; however, these will not be mandatory and it will be at the hosts' discretion how many are included in their program. Hosts will also be permitted to propose other sports beyond this core list for inclusion based on their popularity in the host nation or region.

See also

Asian Games sports
Olympic sports
World Games sports

References

Sports
 
Sports at multi-sport events by competition